A State of Madness is a 2020 Dominican drama film directed by Leticia Tonos. It was selected as the Dominican entry for the Best International Feature Film at the 93rd Academy Awards, but it was not nominated.

Synopsis
A doctor is working in a mental institution during Rafael Trujillo's dictatorship.

Cast
 Luis José Germán as Dr. Antonio Zaglul
 Jane Santos as Aurora
 Pavel Marcano as Gonzales
 Ico Abreu as El Tuerto
 Rick Montero as El Venezolano
 Lia Chapman as Pichirilli

See also
 List of submissions to the 93rd Academy Awards for Best International Feature Film
 List of Dominican submissions for the Academy Award for Best International Feature Film

References

External links
 

2020 films
2020 drama films
2020s Spanish-language films
Dominican Republic drama films